The 2016–17 Luxembourg Cup was the 92nd version of the association football knockout tournament. This competition began on 3 September 2016 and ended on 28 May 2017.

Format
This season's Luxembourg Cup was a single elimination knockout tournament between 104 clubs. The winner of this cup earned a spot in the Europa League. Any matches which are level after regulation proceeded to extra time and then to penalties to determine a winner.

Preliminary round
Four preliminary round matches were played 24 August 2016.

|-
!colspan="3" align="center"|24 August

First round
Thirty-six first round matches were played 2, 3, 4 and 7 September 2016.

|-
!colspan="3" align="center"|2 September

|-
!colspan="3" align="center"|3 September

|-
!colspan="3" align="center"|4 September

|-
!colspan="3" align="center"|7 September

Second round
Thirty-two second round matches were played 16–18 September 2016. The draw for the second round was held 8 September 2016.

|-
!colspan="3" align="center"|16 September

|-
!colspan="3" align="center"|17 September

|-
!colspan="3" align="center"|18 September

Third round
Sixteen third round matches were played 28–30 October 2016. The draw for the third round was held 20 September 2016.

|-
!colspan="3" align="center"|28 October

|-
!colspan="3" align="center"|29 October

|-
!colspan="3" align="center"|30 October

Fourth round
Eight fourth round matches were played 19–20 November 2016. The draw for the fourth round was held 8 November 2016.

|-
!colspan="3" align="center"|19 November

|-
!colspan="3" align="center"|20 November

Quarter–finals
Four quarter-final matches were played 15–17 April 2017. The draw for the quarter-finals was held 20 January 2017.

Semi–finals
Two semi-final matches were played 26–27 April 2017. The draw for the semi-finals was held 18 April 2017.

Final
The final was played on 28 May 2017.

See also
 2016–17 Luxembourg National Division

References

External links
soccerway.com
uefa.com

2016-17
Luxembourg
Cup